Bruno Dary (born 21 December 1952 in Barcelonnette, Alpes-de-Haute-Provence) is a Général d'armée of the French Army and Commandant of the Foreign Legion.

Général Dary is the 136th Military governor of Paris from 1 August 2007 until 31 July 2012.

He is the actual President of the Committee of the Flame under the Arc de Triomphe de l'Étoile, the association in charge of reviving the Flame of the Tomb of the Unknown Soldier.

Military career
He then graduated part of the promotion of the « Général de Linares ». At the end of his studies, he chose to serve in the infantry.

Designated a Sous-lieutenant in 1973, he opted at the completion of the Infantry Application School to serve in the Foreign legion, where he served first in the 2e R.E. at Corte between 1975 and 1976, as a combat section (platoon) chief.

Promoted to Lieutenant in 1975, he then served in the 2ème REP at Calvi from 1976 to 1979 as a combat section chief. During this posting assignment, he took part in the airborne operation of the Battle of Kolwezi in May 1978.

Promoted to Captain in 1979, he joined the 5th Mixed Pacific Regiment, 5e RMP at Moruroa, where he served the qualities of a detachment chief and security officer.

Assigned in 1980 to the 4e RE of Castelnaudary, he commanded between 1982 and 1984, the company of instruction of cadres, whose mission is to form all cadres and Non-Commissioned Officers (NCO) of the Foreign Legion.

Assigned to the headquarters of the 11th Parachute Division 11e DP at Toulouse in 1984, he was named Chef de battalion (Commandant – Major) the same year. He was in charge of all forms and phases of airborne training instructions. In the parallel, he pursued a Diploma of in Depth Studies of Political Sciences and was admitted in 1988 to the École supérieure de guerre in Paris as a candidate of the 102nd promotion.

Following his excellent academic military training, Chef de battalion (Commandant – Major) Dary assumed the functions of chief of operations and instruction bureau at the 13e DBLE at Djibouti which he would finalize service in 1992 as a Lieutenant-colonel. During that tenure, Commandant Dary participated to several operations in the Horn of Africa.

Assigned as the regimental commander of the 2ème REP between 1994 and 1996, he was tasked with commanding, in operations, the French operational assistance element in the Central African Republic from December 1994 to May 1995, the IFOR Infantry Battalion number 2 in Ex-Yugoslavia from November 1995 to April 1996, with almost the entire of the regiment.

Professor at the Interarm Defense College of Paris in 1996 during 4 months, then responsible officer of the « Afrique » cell at the center of the interarm operations of the general staff headquarters for almost 3 years; he was then assigned as the auditor of the Center of the Superior Studies of the National Defense and the Institute of Superior Studies of National Defense in 1999, then section chief « doctrine » at the general staff headquarter of the Armies.

Promoted to Général de brigade in 2002, he assumed command of the 6th Light Armoured Brigade 6e BLB with headquarters stationed at Nîmes. Général de brigade Dary was subsequently engaged for 4 months at the head of the brigade in the Ivory Coast.

In August 2004, Général de division Dary assumed command of the Foreign Legion, a post which he held until 2006.

In 2006, the 75th Anniversary of the Commandement de la Légion Étrangère was celebrated during the tenure of Général de division Bruno Dary.

In September 2006, he was designated as function inspector at the corps of Inspection of the French Army.

Général de corps d'armée Bruno Dary was designated as Military governor of Paris, Commandant of the region Terre Ile-de-France and officer General of the Defense and Security Zone of Paris starting 1 August 2007.

On 16 October 2007, Général de corps d'armée Bruno Dary was designated as a member of the founding Administration Council of the Armed Forces Museum of France.

Général de corps d'armée Bruno Dary was promoted to Général d'armée on 1 June 2012.

Général d'armée Bruno Dary retired from the active service duty on 31 July 2012.

In December 2012, in qualities of a 2nd section officer general, he assumed the Presidency of the Committee of the Flame under the Arc de Triomphe de l'Étoile, the association which is in charge of proceeding civilly the lighting of the Flame of the Tomb of the Unknown Soldier.

On 30 August 2013, Général Dary, mainly accompanied by French paratroopers presided over pronouncing the Military Honors of Commandant Helie de Saint Marc at Place Saint-Jean.

Recognitions and honors 

 Badge d'Instructeur de Parachutisme
 Commandeur de la Légion d'honneur
 Grand officier de l'ordre national du Mérite
 Croix de la Valeur militaire (3 citations)
 Croix du combattant
 Médaille d'Outre-Mer
 Médaille de la Défense nationale (médaille d'argent)
 Medaille de Reconnaissance de la Nation (d'Afrique du Nord)
 Médaille commémorative française
 Croix de la bravoure militaire zaïroise avec palme de bronze (Cross of Military Bravery of Zaire with bronze palm) (1978)
 UNPROFOR Medal
 NATO Medal (former Yugoslavia)
 MINURCA Medal
 Polish Army Medal in bronze
 Order of Merit, Commander (Côte d'Ivoire)
 Unidentified

See also 
 Major (France)
 French Foreign Legion Music Band (MLE)
 Pierre Segretain
 Pierre Jeanpierre
 Jacques Lefort, regimental commander of the 2nd Foreign Parachute Regiment, 2e REP, (1958)
 Pierre Darmuzai, 2e REP (1960)
 Paul Arnaud de Foïard, 2e REP (1965)
 Jeannou Lacaze, 2e REP (1967)
 Helie de Saint Marc
 Roger Faulques
 Bernard Goupil, 2e REP (1972)
 Jean-Claude Coullon
 Jean Brette, 2e REP (1974)
 Philippe Erulin, 2e REP (1976)
 Jean Louis Roué, 2e REP (1978)
 Bernard Janvier, 2e REP (1982)
 Christian Piquemal
 Benoît Puga, 2e REP (1996)
 Éric Bellot des Minières, 2e REP (2008)
 Hervé Charpentier

References 

1952 births
Living people
People from Barcelonnette
French generals
Military governors of Paris
Officers of the French Foreign Legion
Officiers of the Légion d'honneur
Grand Officers of the Ordre national du Mérite
Recipients of the Cross for Military Valour